Momčilo Vuksanović (born 1955) is a Montenegrin educator and the president of the Serb National Council of Montenegro (since 2008) and Assembly president of the Council of People's Assemblies Montenegro (since 2016). He was a delegate in the parliament of Serbia and Montenegro (2003–06). He has founded the magazine Srpske novine, radio station Cool, television station Srpska televizija, and other organizations. He is ethnic Serb, and politically unaffiliated. Since 2006, he is also president of the executive board of the NGO Serbian People's Council of Montenegro.

In July 2016, the court of Bijelo Polje proclaimed him guilty of desecrating a monument to fallen soldiers of the Battle of Mojkovac. As the representative of the Serb National Council of Montenegro, with the blessing of Metropolitan Joanikije, he renovated the monument and added a cross at the top of the monument.

References

Sources

External links

Montenegrin educators
Politicians from Podgorica
Serbs of Montenegro
University of Novi Sad alumni
Serbia and Montenegro politicians
1955 births
Living people